The God of High School is a South Korean manhwa released as a webtoon written and illustrated by Yongje Park. It has been serialized in Naver Corporation's webtoon platform Naver Webtoon since April 2011, with the individual chapters collected and published by Imageframe under their Root label into one volume as of April 2020. The God of High School received official English translations by Line Webtoon beginning in July 2014.

It has received a mobile game and an original net animation short attached to the aforementioned game's original soundtrack. An anime television series adaptation by MAPPA aired from July to September 2020.

Synopsis

Setting
In GOH, the action takes place and involves the inhabitants of three different realms:
The Human Realm is mainly populated by humans and identical to our known world. It is the least powerful realm followed by the Sage Realm and then the Heavenly Realm at the highest.
The Sage Realm (Korean: 동승신주; 신선계; Hanja: 仙界, lit. "World of the immortal/sage"), also known as the Demon Realm, Taoist World, or Other World. It is populated by various mythical creatures, spirits, and monsters (collectively known as demons) such as Dragons, Minotaurs, Phoenixes
The Heavenly Realm (Korean: 신계; Hanja: 神界, lit. "Divine World") is the last realm and the most powerful. The Heavenly Realm is home to many powerful gods of various mythologies and legends like the Jade Emperor, Michael the Archangel, and Hercules.
At the dawn of time, humans, demons and gods lived together on Earth. The gods allowed the weak humans to borrow their powers, creating the "Borrowed Power" system (or "Charyeok" in Korean) so they could defend themselves from the demons who wanted to rule over them. Shortly after the demon defeat, the gods split up the humans, demons and gods among the three Realms. Humans are since able to use Borrowed Power freely but are not allowed to attack gods with it.

Plot
The main protagonist is Mori Jin, a 17-year-old martial artist from Seoul, South Korea. At the beginning of the story, he is invited to join a Martial Arts tournament called "The God of High School" (or GOH). The event, sponsored by a shady corporation, brings together people from high schools all over South Korea on a regional and then, national level in order to select three representatives for the World Tournament. As a prize, the winner gets his wish fulfilled by the hosting corporation, no question asked.

This intrigues Mori, and as he continues through the tournament, he meets many competitors each with a different way of fighting. Martial arts aside, participants fight by using "Borrowed Power", a mystical energy granted by supernatural entities (gods, demons, mythical creatures....), hence the name Borrowed Power. During the opening rounds, he comes across two other martial arts prodigies: Full-Contact Karate expert Daewi Han and epeeist master Mira Yoo. These two would befriend Mori after their fights with him, and will become teamed together as the Korean Team after the preliminary rounds. As the tournaments preliminary rounds finish, and teams assemble, plans for many different people within the organization, and those pitted against them begin to make their moves to achieve their goals.

Characters 
Mori Jin (Jin Moli); (Japanese: ジン・モリ, Jin Mori (Anime)) 
Voiced by: Tatsumaru Tachibana, Hana Sato (Young) (Japanese); Nam Doh-Hyeong, Kim Bo-Na (김보나) (Young) (Korean); Robbie Daymond (English)
A happy-go-lucky 17-year-old martial artist from Seoul, South Korea who practices a fictional version of the Korean martial art Taekwondo called Renewal Taekwondo (Korean: 리뉴얼 태권도) later shorted to Re-Taekwondo. Carefree, friendly and (rightfully so) self-proclaimed "Tough guy" (Korean: 쎈놈), Mori participates to the GOH tournament so that he can fight strong opponents and wish to be reunited with his grand-father Taejin. Later in the series, after the mystical "Borrowed Power" is introduced Mori is labeled as a Genuine Fighter meaning he uses martial arts to fight rather than borrowing power from other beings (one chapter shows that he actually borrowed power from his clone). However, the reason Mori is so powerful is due to his true identity of the mythical Jaechondaesong, or Sun Wukong, the hero of the Chinese Novel Journey to the West. 
After RagnarÖk, he assumes a new form and name via Dan Mori as a result of Park Mujin killing his grandfather and sealing his powers.

Daewi Han (Han Daewi); (Japanese: ハン・デイ, Han Dei (Anime))
Voiced by: Kentarō Kumagai (Japanese); Kwak Yoonsang (Korean); Sean Chiplock (English)
A 17-year-old martial artist from Seoul, South Korea who practices Full-Contact Karate. Daewi starts off the series as a hard-working young man who works to pay off his best friend's hospital bill due to terminal cancer. After being invited to the GOH tournament, he participates to cure his friend of the disease. After his friend's death, Daewi finds a new purpose in his life through his friendship with Mori and Mira and now wants to help them fulfill their dreams. A tall, lazy-looking young man with a loner personality, he is nonetheless fiercely loyal to his friends and willing to go to great lengths to protect them. His Borrowed Power is that of a Haetae, a Korean mythical creature with the ability to control water as a defensive tool or a weapon as well as augmenting attacks. 
After RagnarÖk, he has the Wisdom of the Sage, which allows him to manipulate gravity, electromagnetism, and even nature itself. He also becomes one of The Six.

Mira Yoo (Yu Mila); (Japanese: ユ・ミラ, Yu Mira (Anime))
Voiced by: Ayaka Ōhashi (Japanese); Song Harim (Korean); Veronica Taylor (English)
A 17-year-old swordswoman from Seoul, South Korea and the 25th master of a fictitious sword style called the Moonlight Sword, (Korean: 월강도) which emphasizes strong yet fluid attacks. She initially joins the GOH Tournament in order to fulfill her wish of finding a suitable husband to carry on the school bloodline. Thanks to her friends Mori and Daewi, Mira let go of her family burden and will make a new path for herself. Mira's borrowed power is of an Ancient Chinese general named Lü Bu, which is loosely based on the historical figure of the same name. This power gives her several abilities such as enhanced strength and the ability to summon a red horse (based on Red Hare, the legendary steed of Lü Bu). 
After RagnarÖk, she becomes one of The Six and leader of Neo Nox, a merger of National Assembly of the Homeless and Sang Man-Duk's faction of Nox. She also gains some abilities of Han Daewi via Fundamental Force Manipulation.

Ilpyo Park (Korean: 박일표, Park Ilpyo); (Japanese: パク・イルピョ, Paku Irupyo (Anime))
Voiced by: Kōki Uchiyama (Japanese); KimJi-Yul (Korean), Griffin Puatu (English)
One of the main supporting characters in the series. Ilpyo is a 18-year-old boy competing in the God of High School tournament. He is introduced as a logical and calculating fighter who uses a fictional version of the traditional Korean martial art of Taekkyon (태껸) called Ssamsu-Taekkyon (Korean: 쌈수택견). Ilpyo joined the tournament in order to wish for the recovery of his cousin, crippled during a martial arts competition against Taek Jegal. He later acts as an ally to Mori and helps him through many hardships in the series. His Charyeok is Hojosa, the nine-tail fox of Eastern Asian folklore.

Seungchul Baek (Korean: 백승철, Baeg Seungcheol); (Japanese: ペク・スンチョル, Peku Sunchoru (Anime))
Voiced by: Yūya Uchida (Japanese), Kyle McCarley (English)
A 18-year-old participant in the God of High School tournament who uses a metal baseball bat as a weapon. Seungchul is of genius-level intellect and peak physical conditioning. This makes his fighting style unorthodox and unpredictable for those he is fighting.

Manseok Gang (Korean: 강만석, Gang Manseog); (Japanese: カン・マンソク Kan Mansoku (Anime))
Voiced by: Tomokazu Sugita (Japanese); An Jang-Hyeok (Korean)
A 19-year old participant in the God of High School tournament for the metropolitan region who uses ITF Taekwondo to slaughter his opponents. Manseok is a violent street thug with a sadistic streak who has to be restrained by wearing straitjacket and heavy pants. During his match with Gamdo Go whom he tortures mercilessly, Mori intervenes and knocks Manseok out cold.

Gamdo Go (Korean: 고감도, Go Gamdo); (Japanese: コ・カンド, Ko Kando (Anime))
Voiced by: Hiroyuki Yoshino (Japanese); Lee Dong-Hun (Korean)
A skilled practitioner of Tai Chi Chuan with a polite and composed demeanor. After promising debuts during the preliminaries of the tournament, he is pitted against Gang Manseok who proceed to beat him to a pulp and would have maimed him without the intervention of Mori. Gamdo quits the tournament after that. His role in the story substantially decrease, though he is briefly seen in later arcs mastering traditional medicine and helping the protagonists.

Taek Jegal (Korean: 제갈택, Jaegal Taek); (Japanese: ジェガル・テク Jegaru Teku (Anime))
Voiced by: Kenjiro Tsuda (Japanese); Kaiji Tang (English)
Main antagonist of the first and second arcs. Sold off as a baby by his mother to become the heir of the chairman of a large company, he grew up with a ''Might is right'' philosophy. Dubbed a monster by his opponents and team mates alike, Taek has an arrogant personality and extremely violent style of fighting, viewing everyone around him as insignificant trash. The only exception being the guardian of Ssamsu-Taekkyon, Ilpyo, his mortal enemy and the only person to defeat him years prior to the GOH tournament. Taek's Charyeok is characterized by "Greed", allowing him to absorb other fighter's powers.

Taejin Jin (Korean: 진태진, Jin Taejin); (Japanese: ジン・テジン, Jin Tejin (Anime))
Voiced by: Kazuhiro Yamaji (Japanese); Min Eung-Shik (Korean), Michael Sorich (English)
The adoptive grandfather of protagonist Mori. Probably the strongest Genuine Fighter of the series, Taejin is powerful enough to easily defeat gods by using his sole martial skills. His disdain for Borrowed Power and unlimited potential threaten the status quo between gods and humans and have made him the target of many secret organizations. He is the creator and only master of the fictional Renewal Taekwondo, whom he taught Mori. His disappearance serves as the main motivation for Mori to join the GOH tournament.

Mujin Park (Korean: 박무진, Park Mujin); (Japanese: パク・ムジン, Paku Mujin (Anime))
Voiced by: Daisuke Namikawa (Japanese); Ryu Seung-Gon (Korean), Edward Bosco (English)
Main antagonist of the manhwa. Member of the National Assembly of Korea, he is the figure in charge of the God of High School tournament. In the series, Mujin acts as a mastermind by laying out plans to achieve his goal of obtaining power in order to create a new world. Considered a prodigy and destined for greatness from a very young age, the best shaman in Korea even told him that he would become "a king who will revolutionize the world", setting the history of God Of High School into motion. His Borrowed Power is called "Longinus" which manifests as two yellow crosses appearing on each of Mujin's hands. The name Longinus is loosely based on the Roman soldier said to have pierced the side of Jesus during the Crucifixion. Longinus allows Mujin control over gravity and as a defensive shield. He commands a group of powerful humans specialized in Charyeok called commissioners or executives (Kor: 집행위원). These figures are responsible for recruiting contestants and running the God of Highschool Tournament.

Commissioner O (Korean: 집행위원 O, Jibhaeng-Wiwon O); (Japanese: 審判員O, Shinpan-in O (Anime))
Voiced by: Yuki Kaida (Japanese); Kim Hyun-Wook (Korean);  Lucien Dodge (English)
Member of the judges. Slightly shorter than the other executives, he has white, shoulder-length hair and dark-colored skin. O has won the first G.O.H tournament and, as such, is regarded by his colleagues as the strongest judge. His calm and perky character often makes him act as a mediator between the irritable R and the rash Q, often at each other's throat. He wields the Charyeok "Dragon slayer" which enables him to summon and command dragons as well as controlling fire. O is the one who recruited Mira for the G.O.H Tournament and appears fearful of the young woman, always avoiding eye contact with her and calling her "a monster". His true name is Sochun Yang.

Commissioner P (Korean: 집행위원 P, Jibhaeng-Wiwon P); (Japanese: 審判員P, Shinpan-in P (Anime))
Voiced by: Asami Tano (Japanese); Lee Mi-Na (Korean), Erika Harlacher (English)
Only female member of the judges, she acts a Mujin personal secretary, almost never leaving his side. P is a serious, dutiful and professional executive as well as caring of her colleagues. She is a tall, slim woman, wearing a female version of the Judge's uniform with blue hair tied in a bun. P uses the Charyeok "Marionette" to create "dolls" or copies of other people and be connected to them thus knowing and seeing what they know and see.

Commissioner Q (Korean: 집행위원 Q, Jibhaeng-Wiwon Q); (Japanese: 審判員Q, Shinpan-in Q (Anime))
Voiced by: Kenji Hamada (Japanese); Lee In-Suk (이인석) (Korean); Xander Mobus (English)
Member of the judges. Recognizable by his tall stature, green hair and square glass. Q has a laid back if unorganized way of living his life, yet harbors an arrogant and act-before-thinking temper which often put him at odd with his boss and fellow commissioners. A running gag in the series is that whenever Q fights, his salary lessens. His Charyeok is "Joker", a scythe wielding jester-like entity he can summon with cards. Q recruited Daewi for the tournament and even trained him later on. He eventually married his student's older sister Daeryeong, with whom he has three kids.

Commissioner R (Korean: 집행위원 R, Jibhaeng-Wiwon R); (Japanese: 審判員R, Shinpan-in R (Anime))
Voiced by: Chikahiro Kobayashi (Japanese); Lee Jae-Beom (Korean), Lucien Dodge (English)
Member of the judges. R is a tall, slender man and wears the typical Judge uniform. He has straight blonde hair going down his neck with narrow eyes that are often seen closed. Calm and collected, R is, like the other executives, proud of his strength. This makes him appear annoyed or vindictive when he is bested or doesn't get his way. R's Charyeok is unnamed and very unusual, as it enables him to forcibly take power from gods without their consent and control the wind. He was the one to recruit Mori for the tournament, inflicting the high-schooler his first defeat ever.

Announcer/Commissioner T (Korean: 집행위원 T, Jibhaeng-Wiwon T); (Japanese: 実況T, Jikkyō T (Anime))
Voiced by: Tomokazu Seki (Japanese); Hwang Chang-Young (Korean), Edward Bosco (English)
Member of the judge and the announcer of the GOH tournament. He has black spiky hair and orange sunglasses. Being himself blind, T also goes by the nickname Bongsa Sim, probably based on a blind character of a famous Korean Pansori story: Simcheongga. He has a long and pointed nose with shark-like teeth. Being a very skilled swordsman, T provides some advice to Mira for the tournament, even revealing he owes his blindness to an encounter with Mira's own family's sword style, Moonlight Sword. His true name is Jeongso Sim.

Development 
Author Park Yong-Je majored in cartoon animation at Sunchon National University. Inspired by action genre and Dragon Ball, Park made his debut with "Tough Guy" (쎈놈), published on Naver Webtoon from 2008 to 2009. This manhwa, set around high-school brawlers from Park's hometown of Suncheon, was well received and inspired him to pursue a "100% totally unrealistic work of action" where high schoolers from all over the world would compete to become the God of High School.

Media

Manhwa
Yongje Park launched The God of High School in Naver's webtoon platform Naver Webtoon on April 8, 2011. Its first collected volume was published by Imageframe under their Root label on January 31, 2017. The God of High School was one of the first webtoons to receive official English translations by LINE Webtoon in July 2014.

Volume list

Novel
A spinoff light novel of the webtoon, The God of High School:Eclipse, which was written by Bloody and illustrated by Park Yongje, was launched on Naver's web novel platform Naver Novel, and ran from 2 April 2015 to 28 July 2016.

Game
On 14 August 2014, YD Online announced that they had acquired IP rights for The God of High School to develop a game based on the webtoon.  A team school battle mobile RPG titled The God Of Highschool (갓오브하이스쿨) was later released on 25 May 2015.
A music video from the original soundtrack of the game was released on 11 August 2016 on YouTube with singer Younha as lead vocalist. As of July 2020, the video has attracted over 7 million views.

A 3D mobile RPG game titled G.O.H -The God Of Highschool (G.O.H - 갓오브하이스쿨) developed by SN games Corp., was released on 19 July 2016, with an English version released on 12 September 2018. Jin Mo-ri was voiced by Kang Soo-jin, who is well-known as the Korean voice actor of Luffy from One Piece.

In addition, the characters of Jin Mo-ri, Yu Mi-ra and Park Il-pyo appear as playable characters on I.O. Entertainment's 3D combat P.C. Lost Saga.

A cross-webtoon RPG game titled Hero Cantare was released in 2019, featuring The God of High School and other popular titles such as Tower of God and Hardcore Leveling Warrior.

Anime
An anime television series adaptation was announced in February 2020. MAPPA animated the series and Sola Entertainment provided production management. The anime is directed by Sunghoo Park, with scripts by Kiyoko Yoshimura, Manabu Akita designing the characters, and Alisa Okehazama composing the music. The opening theme is "Contradiction feat. Tyler Carter" by KSUKE, and the ending theme is "WIN." by CIX. It aired from July 6 to September 28, 2020 on Tokyo MX and AT-X in Japan, and on Aniplus and Naver Series On in South Korea. Crunchyroll is on the production committee of the series and simulcasts the Japanese broadcast of the anime. Muse Communication has licensed the series in Southeast Asia and South Asia and released on its Muse Asia YouTube channel and iQIYI. On August 11, 2020, Crunchyroll announced that the series would receive an English dub and premiere on August 24, 2020. Viz Media has licensed the series for home video distribution in North America and has been released on Blu-ray on April 19, 2022.

The anime also has an easter egg in it, where the fighting ring has the Crunchyroll and the Naver Webtoon logos on it, implying that the competition is sponsored by them.

Reception
Nicole Mejias of Crunchyroll said that the series, when on Line Webtoon was an easy sell as it evoked memories of "classic school battling anime" like Tenjho Tenge and fighting games, saying that the series has "top-notch" action with "gorgeous art," along with "various martial arts and skills" from the main cast.

See also
 Taekkyon
 Korean Wave

Notes

References

External links
The God of High School on Naver Webtoon 
The God of High School on Line Webtoon 
Yongje Park's Blog 
 

2010s webtoons
2011 webtoon debuts
2020 anime television series debuts
Anime based on manhwa
Comedy anime and manga
Crunchyroll Originals
MAPPA
Martial arts anime and manga
Muse Communication
South Korean webtoons
Supernatural anime and manga
Television shows based on South Korean webtoons
Television series based on multiple mythologies